This is a List of Wales international rugby union footballers killed in the World Wars:



First World War 

Thirteen were killed in the First World War (Palenski also includes Hopkin Maddock who died on 15 December 1921 from war wounds)

 Billy Geen (3 caps)
 Bryn Lewis (2 caps)
 Fred Perrett (5 caps)
 Lou Phillips (4 caps)
 Charlie Pritchard (14 caps)
 C. G. Taylor (9 caps)
 E.J. Thomas (4 caps)
 Horace Thomas (2 caps)
 Phil Waller (6 caps)
 David Watts (4 caps)
 Dai Westacott (1 cap)
 Johnnie L. Williams (17 caps)
 Richard Garnons Williams (1 cap)

Second World War 
Three were killed in the Second World War:

 Cecil Rhys Davies (1 cap)
 John R Evans (1 cap)
 Maurice J.L. Turnbull (2 caps)

References

See also
List of international rugby union players killed in action during the First World War
 List of Scotland rugby union players killed in the World Wars

World
 
 
Wales
Rugby union footballers killed
Wales in World War I
Wales in World War II
Lists of people killed in World War II